The Tibira do Maranhão was the first documented case of execution due to homosexuality in Brazil. Tibira was a Tupinambá native of Maranhão.

Events 
In 1614, 2 years after the arrival of French colonizers in Northern Brazil, Tibira, which means homosexual in the Tupi language, was sentenced to death for sodomy by Yves D'Évreux, a Capuchin monk Tibira attempted to escape the charge, and fled into the woods for several days, but was re-captured by French authorities. Before his execution, Tibira was baptized by D'Évreux in the name of Saint Dismas, strapped to a cannon, which was fired, killing him. His last words were:

As Tibira was "one of the first people in the New World to be so executed," according to Huw Lemmey and Ben Miller, contemporary Europeans received the story of his fate as implying that "Indigenous people were immoral and unworthy political subjects" and as justifying "harsh penalties and paternalistic rule" over them.

Modern culture 
In 2014, gay activist Luiz Mott started a campaign to get Tibira canonized as a queer saint and recognized as a martyr.

On December 5, 2016, a monument commemorating Tibira was dedicated in Maranhão, Praia Grande, during the State Week of Human Rights.

References

External links 
 Etno-História da Homosexualidade na América Latina

Brazilian gay men
LGBT and Catholicism
Brazilian people of indigenous peoples descent
1614 deaths